Danger, Dr. Danfield is an American old-time radio crime drama. It was broadcast on ABC from August 18, 1946, to April 13, 1947, and was syndicated for several years thereafter.

Premise
The title character was Dr. Daniel Danfield, a criminal psychologist. Each episode featured his dictation of a summary of a case to his secretary, Rusty Fairfax. Dramatic sequences were interspersed with the narration. Danfield's cases often came in response to requests for help from law enforcement agencies. He frequently met with criminals to analyze them and their behavior. The publication Shows of Tomorrow, published by Radio Daily, described the program as having "emphasis on solution of crime rather than on murder."

The 30-minute transcribed program was produced by Teleways Radio Productions.

Personnel
Steve Dunne played Dr. Danfield, and JoAnne Johnson played Rusty Fairfax. Herb Butterfield played Captain Otis, a homicide detective, and Jay Novello played the doctor's chauffeur. Wally Ramsey was the producer, and Ralph Wilkinson was the writer.

See also
Crime Doctor
The Crime Files of Flamond

References

External links

Logs
Log of episodes of Danger, Dr. Danfield from Jerry Haendiges Vintage Radio Logs
Log of episodes of Danger, Dr. Danfield from Old Time Radio Researchers Group

Streaming
Episodes of Danger, Dr. Danfield from the Internet Archive
Episodes of Danger, Dr. Danfield from Zoot Radio

1946 radio programme debuts
1947 radio programme endings
ABC radio programs
Detective radio shows
1940s American radio programs